Christopher Garrett Mohr (born May 11, 1966 in Atlanta, Georgia) is a former American football punter.  Mohr grew up in Thomson, Georgia, where he played football at Briarwood Academy.  He was recruited by the University of Alabama, where he was the team's starting punter for all 4 years.  After being named the Southeastern Conference's best punter his senior year, he spent the 1989 NFL season with the Tampa Bay Buccaneers and was their punter the entire season.  He spent one season with the Montreal Machine of the World League of American Football before being signed by the Buffalo Bills.  Mohr was with the Bills from 1991 to 2000, during which time he appeared in three Super Bowls with the team—Super Bowl XXVI, Super Bowl XXVII, and Super Bowl XXVIII.  He signed with his hometown Atlanta Falcons before the 2001 NFL season, where he played for four years before being waived in 2005.  He was signed by the Washington Redskins before the 2005 NFL season began, but was cut a few days later.  He officially retired from the NFL in 2007 by signing a one-day contract with the Buffalo Bills. Mohr has four boys. Garrett, Harrison, Quinn and Chapman. Garrett Mohr, his oldest son, is currently an NFL free agent.

Of note is that Mohr, along with Casey Beathard, co-wrote "I See Me" for country singer Travis Tritt, which appeared on Tritt's album My Honky Tonk History.

References

External links
NFL.com player page

1966 births
Living people
American football punters
Alabama Crimson Tide football players
Tampa Bay Buccaneers players
Montreal Machine players
Buffalo Bills players
Atlanta Falcons players
Players of American football from Augusta, Georgia
Songwriters from Georgia (U.S. state)
People from Thomson, Georgia